The 2017 Autobacs Super GT Series was the twenty-fifth season of the Japan Automobile Federation Super GT Championship including the All Japan Grand Touring Car Championship (JGTC) era, and the thirteenth season under the name Super GT. It was the thirty-fifth overall season of a national JAF sportscar championship dating back to the All Japan Sports Prototype Championship. The season began on April 9 and ended on November 12, after 8 races.

In the GT500 class, the No. 37 Lexus Team KeePer TOM'S duo of Ryō Hirakawa and Nick Cassidy won their first-ever championship, narrowly beating the Nismo duo of Tsugio Matsuda and Ronnie Quintarelli for the championship. It was the first championship title for TOM'S since Juichi Wakisaka and André Lotterer's 2009 title win. In the GT300 class, in Good Smile Company and Hatsune Miku's 10th season of involvement in Super GT, Goodsmile Racing won their third GT300 title in just seven years after a closely fought championship battle between the No. 4 Hatsune Miku AMG and the No. 65 LEON CVSTOS AMG of K2 R&D LEON Racing. It was Nobuteru Taniguchi and Tatsuya Kataoka's third title, as well as Mercedes' first championship title in Super GT.

Schedule

Calendar Changes
 The series returned to Autopolis for the first time since 2015. The race scheduled to be held there in 2016 was cancelled due to damage caused to the circuit and local infrastructure by the 2016 Kumamoto earthquakes.
 This was the last season that the Suzuka 1000km is included as a round of Super GT, as the current 1000 km format would be dropped in favour of a 10-hour timed race for 2018. The new race will be aimed primarily at FIA GT3 and GT300 machinery.

Drivers and Teams

GT500

GT300

Driver Changes

Team Transfers
 Lexus: Kazuki Nakajima returns to Super GT for the first time since 2014, with Lexus Team au TOM's. He'll be joined by James Rossiter, who swaps seats at TOM's with Nick Cassidy.
 Nissan: Jann Mardenborough makes his GT500 debut with Team Impul, replacing João Paulo de Oliveira, who moves to Kondo Racing to replace Masataka Yanagida.
 Honda: Hideki Mutoh and Daisuke Nakajima will drive for the revived Team Mugen in 2017. Kosuke Matsuura moves to Nakajima Racing from ARTA, who promote Takashi Kobayashi from their GT300 team back to GT500 for the first time since 2012.
 Masataka Yanagida will move down to GT300 with Audi Team Hitotsuyama, replacing Tomonobu Fujii, who will drive for the newly christened D'Station Racing.
 Yuichi Nakayama moves from apr Racing to LM Corsa and the new Lexus RC F GT3, and sophomore driver Rintaro Kubo will replace him in the #31 apr Toyota Prius.
 Hiroki Yoshida replaces former GT300 champion André Couto in the Gainer Nissan GT-R GT3. The latter drove for D'Station Racing as a substitute of Sven Müller during Round 3.
 Shinnosuke Yamada will join Team Taisan SARD after spending one season at Team Upgarage with Bandoh.
 Both Akihiro Tsuzuki and three-time GT300 champion Morio Nitta leave LM Corsa to join the newly unified INGING and Arnage Racing team.

Entering Super GT
 At the Suzuka 1000 km, former Formula 1 driver Kamui Kobayashi will make his Super GT debut in a one-off for Lexus Team WedsSport Bandoh.
 At the Suzuka 1000 km, 2009 Formula 1 champion Jenson Button will make his Super GT debut in a one-off for Team Mugen.
 Reigning Porsche Supercup and Porsche Carrera Cup Germany champion Sven Müller joined D'Station Racing as a Porsche factory driver. However, he would not drive between Rounds 3 and 5 due to his involvement in the ADAC GT Masters, during which André Couto and Yuya Motojima would substitute for him.
 Former FIA F4 Japanese Champion Sho Tsuboi makes his Super GT debut with LM Corsa.
 Takayuki Hiranuma will make his Super GT debut with Saitama Toyopet GreenBrave. Hiranuma has previously driven in Super Taikyu.
 Shintaro Kawabata graduates from the FIA F4 Japanese Championship to Super GT with Team Upgarage with Bandoh.
 Sean Walkinshaw, son of legendary racing driver and team executive Tom Walkinshaw, will make his Super GT debut with Autobacs Racing Team Aguri in their BMW M6 GT3.
 Former Pro Mazda Championship driver Jake Parsons of Australia joins Team Taisan SARD for his first season in Super GT.
 Keishi Ishikawa and Ryosei Yamashita will each make their Super GT debuts with Rn-sports. Ishikawa graduates from All-Japan Formula Three, whilst Yamashita steps up from Super Taikyu and the Toyota 86/BRZ Race.
 Former Honda Formula Dream Project driver Natsu Sakaguchi, and former Nissan Driver Development Programme driver Kiyoto Fujinami will make their Super GT debuts for Team Mach.
 Nattavude Charoensukhawatana and Nattapong Horthongkum will run their first full seasons in Super GT in 2017 for Panther Team Thailand. Charoensukhawatana has run two races as a local wildcard driver, while Horthongkum is making his series debut.

Returning to Super GT
 Kazuki Nakajima returns to Super GT for the first time since 2014, driving for Lexus Team au TOM's.
 Reigning All-Japan Formula Three champion Kenta Yamashita will return to Super GT full-time in 2017, replacing Takeshi Tsuchiya at VivaC Team Tsuchiya.
 Mitsunori Takaboshi returns to Super GT full-time with NDDP Racing.
 Yuji Ide returns to Super GT for the first time since 2015 with EIcars Bentley TTO.
 2011 GT300 champion Taku Bamba will return to Super GT for the first time since 2012, driving for Saitama Toyopet GreenBrave.

Leaving Super GT
 Daisuke Ito will not drive full-time in Super GT this season, and will serve as the team director of Lexus Team au TOM's. He would only drive at the second round of the championship at Fuji Speedway, replacing Kazuki Nakajima, who would instead compete in the 6 Hours of Spa-Francorchamps.
 Tadasuke Makino will move to the FIA European Formula 3 Championship with HitechGP.
 After winning his first Super GT championship in 2016, Takeshi Tsuchiya retired from full-time driving. He will focus primarily on his role as chief engineer for VivaC Team Tsuchiya.
 Oliver Turvey left Drago Modulo Honda Racing after five races in 2016, and will not return to Super GT in 2017.

Mid-season changes
 After André Couto was seriously injured during a round of the China GT Championship held at Zhuhai, D'Station Racing announced Yuya Motojima would replace Couto as substitute driver for Sven Muller, driving in Rounds 4 and 5.

Team Changes

GT500
 Lexus teams will race the new LC 500 machine, replacing the Lexus RC F which debuted in 2014. Nissan and Honda will continue to run the Nissan GT-R and Honda NSX-GT, modified to updated aerodynamic regulations. The updated NSX-GT will be based upon its newly launched production counterpart.
 Drago Modulo Honda Racing announced their withdrawal from the series on 8 November 2016, after just two seasons.
 Intent on continuing to field five teams, Honda announced on 14 November 2016 that Team Mugen would return to the GT500 category for the first time since 2003. The team will run using Yokohama tyres.

GT300 
 Saitama Toyopet GreenBrave announced that they will enter the Super GT Series for the first time in 2017, fielding a brand new Toyota Mark X based on the Mother Chassis platform.
 LM Corsa will field two 2017 specification Lexus RC F GT3s, replacing both their older model RC F GT3, and their Ferrari 488 GT3, used in 2016.
 K2 R&D LEON Racing will switch from Yokohama to Bridgestone tyres in 2017.
 Excellence Porsche Team KTR changed their name to D'Station Racing following a change of ownership and title sponsors. Former baseball pitcher Kazuhiro Sasaki will serve as the team's general representative.
 Bentley and their Continental GT3 race car will make their Super GT debut with the new EIcars Bentley TTO (Teramoto Technical Office) team.
 INGING Motorsport and Arnage Racing will enter under a unified banner in 2017, with the ex-LM Corsa Ferrari 488 GT3 used last season.
 Lamborghini Team Direction have suspended activities in Super GT for the 2017 season, leaving JLOC as the sole representative for Lamborghini in Super GT.

Results

Championship Standings

Drivers' championships

Scoring system

GT500

GT300

Teams' championships

Scoring system

GT500

GT300

References

External links
 Official website

2017
Super GT